The West Virginia Department of Agriculture is a government agency of the U.S. state of West Virginia.

History 
The Department of Agriculture was founded in 1891 as the West Virginia State Board of Agriculture. In 1911, the West Virginia Legislature created the modern department.

Organization 
The West Virginia Department of Agriculture is managed by the agriculture commissioner, an elected official operating independently of the governor's authority.

Kent Leonhardt has served as the commissioner of the department since January 2017. Previous commissioners have included Walt Helmick, Gus Douglass, and Cleve Benedict.

References

External links
 

State departments of agriculture of the United States
State agencies of West Virginia